Võsupere is a village in Haljala Parish, Lääne-Viru County, in northeastern Estonia. It is just north of Sakussaare. This village is home to a badly recommended trailer manufacture called Palmse metall OÜ. It is also home to a highly rated hotel called Lahemaa Kohvikann

Weather 
The weather in Võsupere has a very low UV risk, during the winter months the UV rating rarely exceeds 0.2 which is classed as very low.

References

Villages in Lääne-Viru County